Operation Juneau was a post-World War II U.S. Navy operation which required pre-invasion clearing the minefields in the East China Sea in 1945.

Example of use 

USS Nimble (AM-266)

References 

Non-combat military operations involving the United States
East China Sea
Naval mines